Sançar (or Sancar) is a Turkish surname. People with the surname include:

Aziz Sancar (born 1946), Turkish-US biochemist, molecular biologist, and Nobel Prize laureate
Mithat Sancar (born 1963), Turkish law scholar, columnist, and politician
Nejdet Sançar (1910–1975), Turkish literature teacher
Semih Sancar (1911–1984), Turkish army general

See also
 Sancar (disambiguation)

Turkish-language surnames